The Hyundai Kona is a subcompact crossover SUV produced by the South Korean manufacturer Hyundai. The first-generation Kona debuted in June 2017 and the production version was revealed later that year. It is positioned between the Venue or Bayon and the Tucson in Hyundai crossover SUV line-up. The battery electric version called the Kona Electric (or Kona EV) was first launched in South Korea during the first half of 2018 and rolled out gradually worldwide afterwards.

Naming
The Kona is named after the western district of the island of Hawaiʻi. The company stated the name "reflects the lifestyle of modern customers", in line with its "progressive design" that it adopts. The Kona naming also continues Hyundai’s tradition of naming crossover SUV models after famous travel destinations, including the Creta, Santa Fe, Tucson and Veracruz.

The vehicle is sold in Portugal as the Hyundai Kauai, as Kona is too similar to cona, a slang word for the female genitalia in European Portuguese. It's also sold in Iceland where the word kona means woman in Icelandic. Like Kona, Kauai is a place in Hawaii. It is also Hawaiian for lady.

In China, the vehicle is sold as the Hyundai Encino.

First generation (OS; 2017)

The Kona was revealed in June 2017 in Seoul, South Korea. Positioned below the Tucson, it was the smallest crossover SUV in the Hyundai global line-up until that position was taken by the Venue in 2019. The Kona is built on a newly developed B-segment SUV platform derived from the Hyundai i30 platform which is designed to accommodate a range of powertrains, including fuel cell and electric variants. While it is developed as an urban-oriented crossover SUV, the Kona is available in front-wheel-drive and all-wheel-drive variants; the rear suspension is a torsion beam for the former and a dual-arm multi-link configuration for the latter.

For the North American market, the Kona was launched at the Los Angeles Auto Show in November 2017 and was available at Hyundai dealers in the first quarter of 2018 for the 2018 model year.

The Kona is either not sold or only sold in low volumes in markets where the larger but simpler Creta is offered, such as Latin America, India, and Russia. Southeast Asian countries such as Indonesia, Vietnam and the Philippines are the few countries that briefly sold the petrol-powered Kona before it was indirectly replaced by the Indonesian-built Creta in 2022. The Chinese market had both the Kona and Creta, named there the Encino and ix25 respectively.

Kona Electric
The Kona Electric is a battery electric version of the Kona. It is the second electric car from Hyundai after the Ioniq. Sales started in Korea and Europe in 2018, with a market debut in the United States in 2019.

Kona Electric is available in two battery capacities: 39.2 kWh and 64 kWh. The 'ultimate' trim features adaptive cruise control and along with lane centering means the vehicle meets the SAE standard for Level 2 driverless. Real-world range tests conducted by What Car in early 2019 found that the Kona EV had the highest real-world range among electric cars for sale in the United Kingdom.

On 26 March 2019, Hyundai launched Kona Electric in Thailand. On 9 July 2019, Hyundai launched an Electric Lite version as Kona Electric in India. In 2020, Hyundai started producing the Kona Electric in its European factory in the Czech Republic, where there are plans for an annual production of 30,000 vehicles. Kona Electric reached 100,000 global sales in June 2020.

Hyundai Encino EV was launched on the Chinese car market in November 2019.

In November 2021, the facelifted Hyundai Kona Electric was launched in Malaysia. With three variants, two battery packs are on offer - 39.2 kWh and 64 kWh - with battery ranges going from 303 km in the smaller pack and going up to 484 km in the larger pack.

In 2021, the Hyundai Kona Electric was the 6th best-selling electric vehicle in the UK having achieved a total of 7,199 registrations throughout the year.

Facelift
In September 2020, Hyundai unveiled a facelift version of the Kona, for the original SUV as well as the Kona Electric and N Line models. The facelift primarily had exterior aesthetic changes, alongside extra cargo capacity and rear seat legroom.

Kona N
Released at Hyundai N Day on 27 April 2021, the Kona N is Hyundai’s first high-performance SUV under the Hyundai N division. A 2.0-liter turbocharged GDI engine features flat power that maintains maximum output from about 5,500 rpm. The output can temporarily reach up to  when in the N Grin Shift mode.

In the front, an N logo and a dark chrome-color Hyundai logo are attached to the grille. At the side and rear, a front lip spoiler, double-wing rear spoiler and side sill moulding offer added downforce, improving grip force and high-speed stability. The N-exclusive triangular third brake light gives a dynamic look. Inside, seats, steering wheel, gear knob and hand brake are tinted with Performance Blue while suede seats come with side bolsters. An N-dedicated color Sonic Blue was added and N Grin Shift, N Power Shift, N Track Sense Shift and Variable Exhaust Valve System come as standard.

Powertrain
From launch, the first-generation Kona became available with a 1.0-litre, turbocharged direct injection petrol engine producing , or a 1.6-litre turbocharged direct injection petrol engine producing , with all-wheel-drive option available on selected models.

Special editions 
Kona Iron Man Special Edition
In 2019, Hyundai released a special Iron Man edition Kona (co-branded with Marvel) to promote Avengers: Endgame. The limited edition Kona was finished in matte gray with red accents and features blue daytime running lights, Stark Industries graphics, an Iron Man-themed instrument cluster, arc reactor imagery, and Tony Stark's signature on the dashboard. In the UK, 300 of the version were planned to be available.

Safety
The Hyundai Kona body is made from 51% advanced high strength steel with 'hot stamping' and adhesives for added rigidity. Standard safety equipment includes six airbags, lane keeping assist and a driver attention monitor. Other features include automatic emergency braking with pedestrian detection, blind spot detection and a rear cross traffic alert.

Second generation (SX2; 2023) 

The second-generation Kona was revealed in December 2022. It will be available with petrol, hybrid and battery electric models.

The front clip is decorated seamlessly connected thin horizontal lamps, and the wheel arch cladding design of the side parts is integrated with the front and rear lamps. The rear end has a similarly design horizontal lamps as the front part. For the Kona Electric, the thin horizontal lamps uses the "Pixelated Seamless Horizon Lamp" design. In addition, a parametric pixel design feature has been applied to the front and bottom of the rear bumper.

Powertrain

Awards
At the 2019 North American International Auto Show in Detroit, both the electric and non-electric versions were announced as the winners of the 2019 North American Utility Vehicle of the Year, the first for a subcompact crossover SUV in its award history.

U.S. News & World Report ranked the Hyundai Kona at No. 1 (tied with the Kia Soul and Mazda CX-30) on its list of Best Subcompact SUVs for 2022, giving it a score of 8.4 out of 10.

Sales

Global sales

Regional sales

References

External links

 
  (N Performance)
  (Hyundai N)
  (Kona Electric)
 Kona Digital Studio

Kona
Crossover sport utility vehicles
Mini sport utility vehicles
Cars introduced in 2017
Front-wheel-drive vehicles
Production electric cars
Vehicles with CVT transmission
Euro NCAP small off-road